Pietrek is a surname. Notable people with the surname include:

Anja-Nadin Pietrek (born 1979), German volleyball player
Matt Pietrek (born 1966), American computer scientist and writer